Mauno Koivisto's cabinet was the 51st government of Finland, which lasted from 22 March 1968 to 14 May 1970. It was a majority government which was an based on the popular front model. The Prime Minister of the cabinet was Mauno Koivisto of the Social Democratic Party.

Paasio's cabinet made lot of political reforms; pension laws, family laws, farmers and entrepreneur pension laws and liberating lower alcohol beer sales.

Karjalainen
1968 establishments in Finland
1970 disestablishments in Finland
Cabinets established in 1968
Cabinets disestablished in 1970